Laliyad (or Laliad) is a village and former non-salute Rajput princely state on Saurashtra peninsula in Gujarat, western India.

History
The petty princely state, in Jhalawar prant, was ruled by Jhala Rajput Chieftains. In 1901 it comprised only the village, with a population of 755, yielding 6,000 Rupees state revenue (1903-4, only from land), paying 362 Rupees tribute, to the British.

References

External links
 Imperial Gazetteer, on DSAL.UChicago.edu - Kathiawar

Princely states of Gujarat
Rajput princely states